Kavos is the southernmost seaside village on the island of Corfu in Greece, in the municipal unit of Lefkimmi. Since the early post-war era, it has gained popularity as a resort heavily devoted to tourism and is popular with young (Club 18–30) holidaymakers from Britain, Germany, Serbia and Northern Europe. 

The main part of Kavos is the long strip which runs parallel to the coast line, which contains a large proportion of the restaurants, shops, hotels and apartments.

References

Populated places in Corfu (regional unit)
Seaside resorts in Greece